Paspampres Resident or Perumahan Paspampres is the Housing in the Bogor Regency of West Java, Indonesia. Perumahan (Resident) Paspampres had 26,591 inhabitants at the 2010 Census.

References

External links
 Pictures of Rawa Siradayah 

Bogor Regency